Magdel is a river of Thuringia, Germany. It flows through the town Magdala, and it joins the Ilm near Mellingen.

See also
List of rivers of Thuringia

Rivers of Thuringia
Rivers of Germany